WMGE (1670 AM) is a radio station broadcasting an African American-oriented all-news format from the Black Information Network. Licensed to Dry Branch, Georgia, United States, the station serves the Macon area during the day and the southeast United States at night. The station is owned by iHeartMedia, Inc.

History

WMGE originated as the expanded band "twin" of an existing station on the standard AM band.

In 1967 a new station in Warner Robins began broadcasting as WRBN on 1600 kHz. On March 17, 1997, the Federal Communications Commission (FCC) announced that eighty-eight stations had been given permission to move to newly available "Expanded Band" transmitting frequencies, ranging from 1610 to 1700 kHz, with now-WRCC authorized to move from 1600 to 1670 kHz.

A construction permit for the expanded band station was assigned the call letters WAXP on March 6, 1998. An FCC policy stated that both the original station and its expanded band counterpart could operate simultaneously for up to five years, after which owners would have to turn in one of the two licenses, depending on whether they preferred the new assignment or elected to remain on the original frequency. It was ultimately decided to transfer full operations to the expanded band station, so on January 10, 2002, the license for the original station at 1600 AM, at this point holding the call sign WAXP, was cancelled.

The call letters for the new expanded band station on 1670 AM were changed from WAXP to WNML on July 1, 1998, to WRNC on March 1, 1999, to WMWR on November 17, 2003, to WVVM on February 21, 2006, to WFSM on March 2, 2009, to WPLA on October 14, 2010, and to WMGE on December 14, 2016.

On June 29, 2020, fifteen iHeart stations in markets with large African American populations, including WMGE, began stunting with African American speeches, interspersed with messages such as "Our Voices Will Be Heard" and "Our side of the story is about to be told," with a new format slated to launch on June 30. That day, WMGE, along with the other fourteen stations, became the launch stations for the Black Information Network, an African American-oriented all-news network. Prior to the change, WMGE was a Fox Sports Radio affiliate.

Previous logo

Logo as a Fox Sports Radio affiliate

References

External links

FCC History Cards for operation on 1600 AM (covering 1961-1981 as WRBN / WQCK)

MGE (AM)
IHeartMedia radio stations
Radio stations established in 2004
2004 establishments in Georgia (U.S. state)
Black Information Network stations
All-news radio stations in the United States